Victoria Bartlett is a British-born designer and stylist. She graduated from the London College of Fashion.

Career
Her career began in design, illustration, and brand consultancy for a prestigious portfolio of brands and designers, including Miu Miu, Versace, DKNY, Moncler, Lacroix, Calvin Klein, and Theory. She was the stylist of the first Victoria's Secret Fashion Show 1995. Bartlett gained accolades styling for Björk, Madonna, Scarlett Johansson, David Bowie, Chloe Sevigney, Pharrell Williams, and Venus Williams. She was Fashion Editor at Allure magazine prior to becoming Fashion Director for Interview and BIG Magazine. She has created fashion editorials for i-D, Numéro, V, French, Italian, and L'Uomo Vogue.

List of achievements
1999 Participated in the Brooklyn Anchorage Exhibition presented by Creative Time called "Exposing the meaning in Fashion through Presentation", curated an installation called Loud & Unhinged with film director Douglas Keeves, art director Richard Pandiscio and set designers Big Room.
2002	 Designed the clown sculptures for Ugo Rondinone's exhibition If There Were Anywhere But Desert at Mathew Marks Gallery
2005	 Participated in the FutureFashion's kickoff event for Christo and Jean-Claude's installation of The Gates in Central Park to benefit the Earth Pledge foundation
2009 Curated "A Candid look at the Anatomical fascination of Visible Panty Line" with Susanna Cucco and Gloria Capeletti at Gallery Dopolavoro in Milan
2011 Curated the show Squat with Orly Genger hosted by Yvonne le Force Villareal of Art Production Fund and Clarissa Dalrymple
2011	 Designed costumes in latex for a special performance installation at Cedar Lake Contemporary Ballet with choreographer Benoit Swan
2011	 Collaborated with choreographer Emery LeCrone and Avi Scher for Works & Process at the Guggenheim Museum set to the music of Pulitzer Prize composer Elliott Carter
2011	 Participated in the sartorial exhibition Limited/Unlimited conceived by Silvia Venturini Fendi and curated by Susanna Cucco in Rome
2012	 Curated the group show Second skin with 14 artists including Ugo Rondinone, John Giorno, Sarah Lucas, Genesis P-Orridge, Collier Schorr, Jack Pierson, Adam McEwen, Philip-Lorca diCorcia, David Armstrong, Judith Eisler, Jessica Mitrani, Shoplifter, Mark Borthwick and Katerina Jebb
2012 Winner of the CFDA/Lexus Eco Challenge
2013	 "Lightness of Being" live clown sculpture collaboration with Ugo Rondinone for the Public Art Fund in City Hall Park

References

External links

Who Will Pull Together the Collections?

Alumni of the London College of Fashion

Year of birth missing (living people)
Living people
People from Gloucester